Modran is a village in Jalore District of Rajasthan.
It is around 7 km to the south of Bakara Road and 17 km to the west of Bagra. The nearest village is Basda Dhanji, 5  km to the south. Eighteen kilometers to the north-west is Sayala. The locally famous Temple   shree Ashapuri Mata temple is located here.

Transport

Modran lies on the road which leads in the northern direction from Bhinmal.

Modran Railway Station is on the Bhinmal-Jalore rail route. Passenger trains connecting Palanpur and Samdari pass through this station.

The Jodhpur Airport serves Modran.

References

Villages in Jalore district